The Rivière des Pluies is a river on the Indian Ocean island of Réunion. It flows to the sea on the island's northern shore, between the communes of Saint-Denis and Sainte-Marie.

It gives its name to a district of Sainte-Marie that overlooks the river, and is inhabited by many people working in the capital.

River crossings
Rivière des Pluies is crossed by five bridges, from upstream to downstream.
A bridge carrying a water supply canal.
Desbassyns bridge, a road bridge carrying the main road 45.
The Pont Neuf, a road bridge carrying the highway 102.
A road bridge on Route Nationale 6, the most recent.
A road bridge on the highway 2.

References 

Rivers of Réunion
Saint-Denis, Réunion
Rivers of France